Mildred McElroy Clingerman (March 14, 1918 – February 26, 1997) was an American science fiction author.

Clingerman was born Mildred McElroy in Allen, Oklahoma, and her family moved to Tucson, Arizona, in 1929. She graduated from Tucson High School and attended the University of Arizona. She married Stuart Clingerman in 1937.

Most of her short stories were published in the 1950s in The Magazine of Fantasy & Science Fiction, edited by Anthony Boucher. Boucher included her story "The Wild Wood" in the seventh volume (1958) of The Best from Fantasy and Science Fiction and dedicated the book to her, calling her the "most serendipitous of discoveries."  Her science fiction was collected as A Cupful of Space in 1961. She also published in mainstream magazines like Good Housekeeping and Collier's. Her story "The Little Witch of Elm Street" appeared in Woman's Home Companion in 1956.

Married women are portrayed in stories like “The Wild Wood” (January 1957 F&SF) or “A Red Heart and Blue Roses” (original to her collection); they suffer violations of body space, male intrusiveness, and the impostures of aliens. Her stories have also appeared in several anthologies, including literature textbooks for middle and high school students. A 2017 anthology, The Clingerman Files, includes all of her originally published stories.

Clingerman was a collector of books of all kinds, especially those by and about Kenneth Grahame, and of Victorian travel journals. She was a founder of the Tucson Writer's Club and served on the board of the Tucson Press Club. She was posthumously awarded the Cordwainer Smith Rediscovery Award in 2014.

Awards 
2014 Cordwainer Smith Rediscovery Award

Selected works 
“First Lesson” (Collier’s Weekly, June 1955)

“Stickney and the Critic” (The Magazine of Fantasy and Science Fiction, February 1953)

“Stair Trick” (The Magazine of Fantasy and Science Fiction, August 1952)

“Minister Without Portfolio (The Magazine of Fantasy and Science Fiction, February 1952)

“Letters From Laura” (The Magazine of Fantasy and Science Fiction, October 1954)

“The Last Prophet” (The Magazine of Fantasy and Science Fiction, August 1955)

A Cupful of Space (Ballantine, 1961)

“Red Heart and Blue Roses” (The Magazine of Fantasy and Science Fiction, May 1964)

The Clingerman Files (2017)

References

External Links
 Official website

1918 births
1997 deaths
American science fiction writers
American women short story writers
Writers from Tucson, Arizona
University of Arizona alumni
University of Arizona faculty
Novelists from Oklahoma
Women science fiction and fantasy writers
American women novelists
20th-century American novelists
20th-century American women writers
20th-century American short story writers
Novelists from Arizona
People from Allen, Oklahoma
American women academics
Tucson High School alumni